Attur is a small village in Karkal taluk, Udupi District, Karnataka state, India. It comes under Nitte panchayat and is a part of Mysore Division.

Hejamadi (13 km), Palimaru (13 km) and Padubidri (16 km) are the nearby villages to Attur. It is surrounded by Karkal and Udupi taluks to the north and Bantval taluk to the east.

Mangalore, Mudbidri, Karkala, Udupi are the nearby cities.

It is near to the Arabian Sea, which means that the weather is quite hot and humid.

See also
 Udupi District
 Districts of Karnataka

References

External links
 https://web.archive.org/web/20171101221550/http://udupi.nic.in/

Villages in Udupi district